American Psychologist is a peer-reviewed academic journal published by the American Psychological Association. The journal publishes articles of broad interest to psychologists, including empirical reports and scholarly reviews covering science, practice, education, and policy, and occasionally publishes special issues on relevant topics in the field of psychology. The editor-in-chief is Harris Cooper (Duke University).

The journal has implemented the Transparency and Openness Promotion (TOP) Guidelines that provide structure to research planning and reporting and aim to make research more transparent, accessible, and reproducible.

Abstracting and indexing
The journal is abstracted and indexed in:

According to the Journal Citation Reports, the journal has a 2021 impact factor of 16.358.

See also
Developmental Psychology
Journal of Abnormal Psychology
Journal of Experimental Psychology
Journal of Personality and Social Psychology

References

External links

English-language journals
Publications established in 1946
American Psychological Association academic journals
Psychology journals
9 times per year journals